HD 123569 is a single star in the southern constellation of Centaurus, positioned near the eastern constellation border with Lupus. This object has a yellowish hue and is visible to the naked eye with an apparent visual magnitude of 4.74. It is located at a distance of approximately 176 light years from the Sun based on parallax, and it has an absolute magnitude of +1.00. The star is drifting closer with a radial velocity of −17 km/s. O. J. Eggen flagged this star as a member of the Hyades Supercluster.

This is an aging giant star with a stellar classification of G9-III, having exhausted the supply of hydrogen at its core then evolved off the main sequence by cooling and expanding. At present it has around 8.25 times the girth of the Sun, with a slightly higher than solar metallicity – what astronomers term the abundance of elements with a higher atomic number than helium. The star is radiating 40 times the luminosity of the Sun from its enlarged photosphere at an effective temperature of 5089 K.

References 

G-type giants
Hyades Stream
Centaurus (constellation)
241496
Centauri, 321
123569
069191
5297